On November 6, 2018, a general election in the U.S. state of Missouri was held for the post of State Auditor of Missouri. The election for Missouri State Auditor coincided with the U.S. federal midterm elections that were held throughout all 50 states, as well with other state legislative and local races in Missouri. Missouri's Class 1 United States Senate seat was also up for election on November 6, 2018.

The primary elections for this race were held on August 7, 2018. The Democrats nominated incumbent Missouri State Auditor Nicole Galloway, while the Republicans nominated attorney Saundra McDowell.

Galloway won election to a full term. Prior to this, Galloway had been appointed to the post by former Governor Jay Nixon in 2015, following the death of Tom Schweich.

Following the Republican victories in the elections on November 8, 2016 for Governor of Missouri, U.S. Senate, Lieutenant Governor, Missouri State Treasurer, Attorney General, and Secretary of State, Galloway and U.S. Senator Claire McCaskill became the only two remaining Democratic statewide officeholders in Missouri. McCaskill's failed re-election campaign in 2018 made Galloway the state's only Democratic statewide officeholder and only female statewide elected official. Her victory also marks the only Democratic win in a statewide election in the state since 2012. As of 2023, this was the last time a Democrat won a statewide election in Missouri.

Democratic primary

Candidates

Declared
 Nicole Galloway, incumbent State Auditor of Missouri

Results

Republican primary

Candidates

Declared
 Kevin M. Roach, Ballwin city alderman and accountant
 Saundra McDowell, attorney and former State Director of Enforcement of Securities Division
 Paul Curtman, state representative
 David Wasinger, attorney

Results

General election

Polling
{| class="wikitable" style="font-size:90%;text-align:center;"
|- valign=bottom
! Poll source
! Date(s)administered
! Samplesize
! Marginof error
! style="width:100px;"| NicoleGalloway (D)
! style="width:100px;"| SaundraMcDowell (R)
! Other
! Undecided
|-
| Missouri Scout/Remington (R)
| align=center| November 1–2, 2018
| align=center| 1,424
| align=center| ± 2.6%
|  align=center| 49%
| align=center| 38%
| align=center| 6%
| align=center| 7%
|-
| Missouri Scout/Remington (R)
| align=center| October 24–25, 2018
| align=center| 1,376
| align=center| ± 2.6%
|  align=center| 48%
| align=center| 38%
| align=center| 7%
| align=center| 7%
|-
| Missouri Scout/Remington (R)
| align=center| October 17–18, 2018
| align=center| 1,215
| align=center| ± 2.7%
|  align=center| 46%
| align=center| 42%
| align=center| –
| align=center| 12%
|-
| Missouri Scout/Remington (R)
| align=center| September 26–27, 2018
| align=center| 1,555
| align=center| ± 2.5%
| align=center| 43%
|  align=center| 44%
| align=center| –
| align=center| 13%
|-
| Missouri Scout/Remington (R)
| align=center| August 8–9, 2018
| align=center| 1,785
| align=center| ± 2.3%
| align=center| 42%
|  align=center| 47%
| align=center| –
| align=center| 11%
|-

Results

References

Auditor
Missouri State Auditor elections
November 2018 events in the United States
Missouri